The following is a list of association football clubs in the Principality of Monaco. As of December 2012, there were 64 clubs registered within Monaco.



Clubs

A 
 A. Personnel Poste Monaco
 Anciens O.S. Monaco
 AS Monaco FC
 AS Poste Monaco 
 Association Jeunesse et Sport des Monéghetti
 Association Sportive Du Mentonnais
 AST

B 
 Banque du Gothard 
 Banque J. Safra 
 BNP Paribas 
 BPCA

C 
 Café de Paris 
 Caisses Sociales MC
 Carabiniers du Prince
 Carrefour Monaco
 Casino Monte-Carlo 
 CCF Cabinet Wolzok  
 CFM Monaco 
 CMB-SAMIC 
 Cogenec CFM 
 Crédit Foncier 
 CTM

D 
 Décathlon

E 
 Entente Services Public
 Experian Scorex

F 
 Fonction Publique

G 
 GEM Bâtiment  
 Grimaldi Forum

H 
 HBS
 Hôpital de Monaco  
 HSBC Republic Bank

I 
 IM2S Football Team

L 
 Lancaster Group  
 Loews Hotel

M 
 Mairie de Monaco  
 Maison d'Arrêt 
 Mecaplast Group 
 Monaco Logistique 
 Monaco Telecom Le Groupe 
 Monte-Carlo Country Club

O 
 Office des Téléphones  
 OSM Monacolor

P 
 Palais Princier 
 Parkings Publics  
 Poste

R 
 Radio Monte Carlo  
 Ribeiro Freres 
 Richelmi

S 
 SAMIC 
 SDAU  
 SBM Administration 
 SBM Loews Jeux  
 SBM Jeux 
 SBM Slot Machines 
 SIAMP CEDAP  
 Silvatrim 
 Single Buoy Moorings  
 Slot San Casiono 
 Slots Machines 
 SMA 
 Sofamo Biotherm 
 Sun Casino 
 Sapeurs Pompiers Monaco
 SUC  
 Sûreté Publique

T 
 Theramex

U 
 UBS Monaco

Notes

Monaco

Monaco sport-related lists
Lists of organisations based in Monaco